Rodolfo Navarro Rodríguez (born September 10, 1974, in Guadalajara, Jalisco) is a Mexican football manager and former player.

References

External links

1974 births
Living people
Mexican football managers
Mexican footballers
Club León footballers
Tigres UANL footballers
Tecos F.C. footballers
Liga MX players
Footballers from Guadalajara, Jalisco
Association footballers not categorized by position